Besar Island ("Big Island",) is an island approximately 13 km off the coast of mainland Malacca in Malaysia. It is served by private motorboats from the towns of Pernu and Umbai and scheduled ferries from the Anjung Batu Jetty in Umbai.

There are a few attractions which spread across the island, including the tombs of Baghdad-born Islamic preacher Sultan Al Ariffin Syeikh Ismail and his relatives, who were part of an entourage responsible for the spread of Islam throughout the Malay Archipelago after arriving at the island in 1495. There are also tombs of local figures, unmarked graves and numerous mystical and legendary old wells and rock formations. According to local legends, one of the wells is believed to contain salt water at high tide and fresh water during low tide. The island is believed to be the home of elves known as Orang bunian and there is a cave known as Yunos Cave, where warriors were said to practice mysticism and learn silat (a type of Malay martial arts) in the past. The Besar Island Museum, operated by the state's Museum Corporation displays various information related to the island's sights and legend.

Gallery

References

Central Melaka District
Islands of Malacca
Islands of the Strait of Malacca
Tourist attractions in Malacca